Rita Zeqiri (born 8 December 1995) is a Kosovan swimmer. She competed in the women's 100 metre backstroke event at the 2016 Summer Olympics.

References

External links
 

1995 births
Living people
Kosovan female swimmers
Olympic swimmers of Kosovo
Swimmers at the 2016 Summer Olympics
Place of birth missing (living people)
Female backstroke swimmers